Iván Marcelo Álvarez Valenzuela (born 20 January 1980 in Curicó) is a former Chilean football forward. His last club was Rangers de Talca.

Club career
Born in Curicó, as a child, Álvarez and his twin brother, Cristián, were with Escuela de Fútbol Municipal de Curicó (Municipal Football Academy of Curicó), later named Juventud 2000, what was founded by his father Luis Hernán. Next, he began to play in Club Deportivo Universidad Católica youth system, being promoted to first adult in 2000. The next year was sent on loan to second-tier side Deportes Temuco, where he helped to achieve the Primera B title, being him one of the tournament's goalscorer with 14 scores.

After being released from Católica, between 2003 and 2004 he played for Rangers de Talca (where he had a good spell), Santiago Wanderers and Palestino.

After playing for Deportes Concepción in 2005, the incoming year, he joined Bolivian side Jorge Wilstermann. Then, from 2007 to 2009, he played for Deportes Puerto Montt (except in 2008 when was loaned to Deportes Melipilla).

In 2011, he retired from football, being his last club Rangers de Talca (now in the second division), when achieved the promotion to top-tier.

International career
Álvarez and his twin brother, Cristián, represented Chile at under-17 level in both the 1997 South American Championship and the 1997 FIFA World Championship.

Personal life
He is the twin brother of Cristián Álvarez and son of Luis Hernán Álvarez, legendary scorer of Chilean giants Colo-Colo.

Álvarez also worked as a panelist of a football program in Canal del Fútbol (CDF) called En El Nombre del Fútbol.

Honours

Club
Deportes Temuco
 Primera B (1): 2001

Cobreloa
 Primera División de Chile (1): 2004 Clausura

External links

References

1980 births
Living people
People from Curicó
Chilean twins
Chilean footballers
Chile youth international footballers
Club Deportivo Universidad Católica footballers
Deportes Temuco footballers
Rangers de Talca footballers
Santiago Wanderers footballers
Cobreloa footballers
Club Deportivo Palestino footballers
Deportes Concepción (Chile) footballers
Puerto Montt footballers
C.D. Jorge Wilstermann players
Chilean Primera División players
Primera B de Chile players
Bolivian Primera División players
Chilean expatriate footballers
Chilean expatriate sportspeople in Bolivia
Expatriate footballers in Bolivia
Twin sportspeople
Association football forwards
Chilean association football commentators
Canal del Fútbol color commentators